The 5th IBU Junior Open European Championships were held from 11 to 12 March 2020 in Hochfilzen, Austria.

Schedule
All times are local (UTC+1).

Medal summary

Medal table

Men

Women

Mixed

References

External links
Official website 

IBU Junior Open European Championships
IBU Junior Open European Championships
IBU Junior Open European Championships
IBU Junior Open European Championships
Biathlon Junior Open European Championships
IBU Junior Open European Championships
IBU Junior Open European Championships